Ngardi, also spelt Ngarti or Ngardilj, is an Australian Aboriginal language that is considered moribund. It was previously thought to be an alternative name for the Bunara language, but these are now classified as separate languages. It was/is spoken by the Ngarti people of the Northern Territory and northern Western Australia.

Classification
Capell (1962) considered Ngardi, Warlpiri, and Warlmanpa to be dialects of a single language. R. M. W. Dixon (2002) grouped Ngardi together with Warlpiri and Warlmanpa in the Yapa group, but admitted that this was based on limited data. McConvell and Laughren (2004) showed that it was in Ngumbin, a closely related group, and this was followed in Honeyman (2005). However, Bowern (2011) listed it as a more distant Wati language.

Tindale shows Ngardi as an alternative name for Bunara language, but Lynette Oates and Arthur Capell showed that Bunara was a separate language. The two languages have now been assigned separate code in AIATSIS's AUSTLANG database.

Waringari
Some old recordings and manuscripts refer to Waringari (or Waiangara) as a language related to Ngardi, but linguists have agreed that it is a geographical name and not the name of a language. Norman Tindale listed Waringari as a pejorative name for the Ngarti people, as well as for the Yeidji, the Worla  and the Warlpiri, suggesting that they were cannibals.

Phonology

Vowels

Consonants

See also
Ngururrpa, a grouping of peoples of language groups including Ngardi

References

Sources

McConvell and Laughren (2004) "The Ngumpin-Yapa subgroup". In Claire Bowern & Harold Koch, Australian Languages: Classification and the Comparative Method. Amsterdam/Philadelphia: John Benjamins Publishing Company.

Ngumbin languages
Ngarrkic languages
Wati languages